The Reinas de Belleza del Paraguay 2018 pageant was held at the Resort Yacht y Golf Club Paraguayo on August 24, 2018, to select Paraguayan representatives to major beauty pageants: Miss Universe, Miss World, Miss Earth, among others. It was broadcast live on RPC. 
There were two groups of candidates: Miss Universe/Earth candidates; and Miss World candidates.

Results
Miss Universe/Miss Earth group 

Miss World group

Special awards

Contestants

Miss Universe/Miss Earth group
There were 8 official contestants.

Miss World group
There were 7 official contestants.

Judges
The twelve judges for the final telecast include:

 Gloria de Limpias, president of Promociones Gloria
 Sally Jara, Miss Universe Paraguay 2014
 Pablo Damota, General Manager of Yacht y Golf Club Paraguayo
 Luis Vellasai, architect, set designer, actor 
 Bettina Barboza, Miss Universe Paraguay 1995
 Egni Eckert, Miss Universe Paraguay 2012
 Marcos Margraf,, director of Margraf Dental Center
 César Fretes, president of One 2 One
 Guillermo Fridman, professional photographer, make-up artist for Maybelline Paraguay
 Marina Mora, Miss Perú 2001
 Luz Marina González de Durán, Miss Universo Paraguay 1988
 Carsten Pfau, president of Agriterra

See also
Miss Paraguay
Miss Universe 2018
Miss World 2018
Miss International 2018
Miss Earth 2018

External links
Promociones Gloria, holder of the franchises.
Reinas de Belleza del Paraguay Facebook Page

References

2018 beauty pageants
2018 in Paraguay
2018
August 2018 events in South America